Sundance Towne Center is a regional shopping center by Vestar Development located south of Interstate 10 on the intersections of S. Watson Road and W. Yuma Road in the city of Buckeye, Arizona. The first phase of development opened in the spring of 2007.

Major tenants include (as of May 2010):
Lowe's (opened April 2007)
PetSmart (opened July 2007)
Wal-Mart SuperCenter (opened August 2007)
OfficeMax (opened August 2007) (Closed)

Smaller retail and restaurant tenants include (as of May 2010):
AutoZone
 Brakes Plus
Carl's Jr. (Opened in Spring/Summer 2010)
Chipotle Mexican Grill
Cracker Barrel
El Pollo Loco
Fantastic Sams
 GameStop
 Go Wireless (Verizon Wireless)
 Hula Hawaiian BBQ (Closed)
 Juice It Up! (Closed)
KFC
 Leslie's Swimming Pool Supplies
M&I Bank (Closed)
 Nationwide Vision
Payless ShoeSource (Closed)
Panda Express
Papa John's Pizza
Peter Piper Pizza
Quiznos Sub (Closed)
 Planet Beach (Closed)
 Pretty Nails & Spa
 Sleep America (Closed)
State Farm Insurance
 Sundance Dental Group
Taco Bell
Wells Fargo
Wienerschnitzel (Closed)
Wendy's

Former tenants include (as of May 2010):
Alltel (Closed due to acquisition by Verizon Wireless)
Linens 'n Things (Closed due to corporate bankruptcy)

External links
 Sundance Towne Center

Buildings and structures in Maricopa County, Arizona
2007 establishments in Arizona